Courtney Lynn Petersen (born October 28, 1997) is an American professional soccer player who plays as a defender for Houston Dash of the National Women's Soccer League (NWSL).

Early life 
Growing up in Canton, Michigan, Petersen played youth soccer as a midfielder for Michigan Hawks ECNL and was voted to numerous ECNL Top-11 squads. In 2014 she was named as an NSCAA Youth All-American. Coming out of high school, Petersen ranked as the No. 23 recruit in the nation by TopDrawerSoccer.com.

Virginia Cavaliers 
In October 2013, Petersen committed to playing college soccer at the University of Virginia. She played four seasons for the Virginia Cavaliers between 2015 and 2019, sitting out the 2016 season to focus fully on national team duty for the 2016 FIFA U-20 Women's World Cup. Predominantly a left-sided full-back, Petersen proved to be a versatile player during her collegiate career, also playing in midfield. As a freshman she scored a career-high three goals and added another three assists in 22 appearances, ending the year as an ACC All-Freshman team selection. In her senior year, Petersen was an All-Region First Team selection by United Soccer Coaches, a TopDrawerSoccer Best XI Second Team selection and an All-ACC Second Team selection.

In the 2018 and 2019 offseasons, Petersen played with hometown WPSL side Motor City FC.

Professional career

Orlando Pride 
Petersen was selected in the first round (7th overall) of the 2020 NWSL College Draft by Orlando Pride. She signed with the team in March but with the season disrupted by the COVID-19 pandemic, was unable to make her debut until September 19, 2020 in the first Fall Series match, starting in a 0–0 draw with North Carolina Courage. She appeared in all four Fall Series matches, playing the full 90 minutes in each.

Houston Dash 
Petersen had a contract offer extended to her by Orlando at the end of the 2022 season but in February 2023, the club agreed to trade her rights to Houston Dash along with a natural third-round pick in the 2024 NWSL Draft in exchange for $65,000 in allocation money plus an additional $25,000, pending conditions met.

International career 
Petersen has represented the United States at under-14, under-15, under-17 and under-20 levels, mainly playing as a midfielder. In 2016, Petersen competed at the 2016 FIFA U-20 Women's World Cup, playing two games as the team finished fourth.

Career statistics

College

Club 
.

References

External links 

 Virginia profile
 

1997 births
Living people
American women's soccer players
Virginia Cavaliers women's soccer players
Orlando Pride draft picks
Orlando Pride players
Women's Premier Soccer League players
National Women's Soccer League players
Soccer players from Michigan
People from Canton, Michigan
Women's association football defenders
Women's association football midfielders
United States women's under-20 international soccer players